Matthew Andrias Grieve (born 8 November 1990) is an English footballer who plays as a defender for Whickham.

Club career

Newcastle United
He joined the Newcastle United Academy in July 2007, having completing his education and having already played for the club at all levels between Under 14 and Under 18. He played for the Under 18 team at the age of 15, and was named in the reserves at the end of the 2006–07 season. He made his reserve team debut against Wigan on 8 October 2007. He was released on a free transfer at the end of the 2011 season.

Stockport County
On 7 January 2011 he joined Stockport County on loan for a month, and was given the number 26 shirt. He made his Football League debut the following day in a 5–1 home defeat to Gillingham. Three days later, in his second match for the club, he scored an own goal in a match against Rotherham United. He returned to his parent club having sustained a facial injury.

Non-League football
Following his release from Newcastle United Grieve signed for hometown club Ashington, signed for Darlington 1883, and then returned to Ashington. He then moved to Celtic Nation F.C in September 2013 and later played for Whickham in The Ebac Northern League 1st division.

Career statistics

Statistics accurate as of match played 22 January 2011

References

External links

Newcastle United profile

1990 births
Living people
Association football defenders
English footballers
Newcastle United F.C. players
Stockport County F.C. players
Ashington A.F.C. players
Darlington F.C. players
Celtic Nation F.C. players
English Football League players
Sportspeople from Ashington
Footballers from Northumberland